Laneuveville-aux-Bois is a commune in the Meurthe-et-Moselle department in north-eastern France. The inhabitants of the town of Laneuveville-aux-Bois are called Laneuvillois, Laneuvilloises in French.

See also
Communes of the Meurthe-et-Moselle department

References 

Laneuvevilleauxbois